Rugby union in Cornwall (before 1900) is a timeline of rugby union in Cornwall in the 19th century.

History
Richard Carew in his Survey of Cornwall (1602) gives some laws of a game which has similarities to rugby. 
 "Two bushes are pitched in the ground eight or twelve feet asunder, directly against which at a distance of ten or twelve yards apart two more bushes in like manner, which are called goals.
 ″The hurlers to goal are bound to observe these orders or Laws:″
 ″In contending for the ball, if a man's body touches the ground, and he cries Hold and delivers the ball, he is not to be further pressed.″ (the mark)
 ″That the hurler must deal no foreball, or throw it to any partner standing nearer the goal than himself.″ (the forward pass)
 ″In dealing the ball, if any of the adverse party can catch it flying .... the property of it is thereby transferred to the catching party; and so the assailants become defendants, and the defendants assailants.″ (the interception)
 ″A breach made in any of these Articles is motive sufficient for the hurlers going together by the ears; nor do any seek to take revenge but in the same matter.″ (the scrum).

Before 1900, rugby union in Cornwall was referred to as football and what is known today as football was then called ″association″ or soccer. Before the formation of the Cornwall RFU in 1883, the press did not consistently record rugby matches so it is uncertain when it was first played in Cornwall. The first recorded rugby match in Penzance is from 1870, played in the grounds of Poltair House, Heamoor and organised by W Borlase of Marlborough School. The Penzance team was mostly public schoolboys, home on holiday, and their opponents, the Eastern Telegraph Company was based in Porthcurno. In Penryn, before 1872 a team made up of workers from Freeman's granite yard played a team from Sara's Foundry in a field near the Cross Keys hotel. In the main, rugby was mainly confined to the western half of Cornwall, from Penzance in the west to Truro in the east.

1883–84

Friendly

Cornwall. Backs: Bernard F Edyvean, capt. (Bodmin), A Trounson (Penzance), Three-quarters: J W Everett (Redruth), E P P Tyacke (Helston), W H Willcocks (Tregony), Half-backs: G Eustice (Hayle), Luke Smith (Redruth), Forwards: G H Chilcott (Truro), N Harvey (Hayle), E H Ratcliffe (Helston), R C Jones (Pool), C Barrett (Hayle), W Rowe (Hayle), W Rowe (Redruth) and F Bond (Camborne).
 Cornwall's first match.

1884–85

Friendly

1885–86

Friendly

Cornwall. Messrs E P P Tyacke, White (Tregony), G Kistler (Penzance), Luke (Truro) and J H Genn, captain (Falmouth) mentioned in the match report.
 Cornwall's try was their first.

Friendly

1886–87

Friendly

Cornwall. Fullback; J B Cornish capt. (Penzance), Three-quarters; Kistler, (Penzance), T Smith (Redruth), Thomas (Penryn), Half-backs; T J Peak (Penzance), T Edwards (Camborne), Forwards; Fitzgerald (Falmouth), Wolf (Redruth), J Henwood (Camborne), Vincent (Penryn), A S Grylls (Redruth), R Chappell (Camborne), Boskeen (Redruth), Chilcott (Truro).

Cornwall. Fullback; Hall (Penryn), Three-quarters; Kistler, (Penzance), W Smith (Redruth), T Smith (Redruth), Half-backs; Peake (Penzance), Edwards (Camborne), Forwards; J Luke (Redruth), J Henwood (Camborne), Wolf (Redruth), Thomas {Redruth), Northey (Hayle), Sincock (Hayle), Pryor (Hayle), Vincent (Penryn), Jenkins (Camborne)

1892–93

County Championship

 This was Cornwall's first match in the County Championship. Gloucester scored 3 goals and 2 tries.

 Devon scored 2 goals and 5 tries.
 The match with Somerset was cancelled by the Somerset secretary ″on account of gate difficulties″.

Friendly

Cornwall. Back: Blewett, Three-quarters: Kistler, W D Lawry (Penzance), H Carvolth (Redruth), Phillips, Halves: W Paull (Redruth), Gray (Redruth), Forwards: Grylls, W F Woolf (Redruth), N James (Redruth), Williams, J Nancarrow (Redruth), Thorne, Masters and Berry.

1894–95

County Championship

 Eight Cornish players made their championship debut. Three Somerset players were England internationals.

 Full-back: J Eathorne (Redruth). Three-quarters: A G Chapman (Falmouth), J Thomas (Redruth), J Viant (Redruth), S Hosking (Camborne). Halves: W Paull (Redruth), Paige (Falmouth). Forwards: Caselet (Camborne), R Johns (Camborne), D. Campbell (Camborne), O Triggs (Penzance), S Wesley (Redruth), C Pearce (Redruth), Trerise (Falmouth) and W Smith (Falmouth).

 Full-back: J Eathorne (Redruth). Three-quarters: A G Chapman (Falmouth), J Thomas (Redruth), S Hosking (Camborne), J W Nunn (Penzance). Halves: W Paull (Redruth), E L Hammond. Forwards: R Johns (Camborne), D. Campbell (Camborne), P C Tarbutt, C A P Tarbutt, H Olivey, A Kitson, F A L Hammond and O Triggs (Penzance).
 Debuts: J W Nunn, E L Hammond, F A L Hammond, C A P Tarbutt, A Kitson.

Cornish Rugby League
The first season of the Cornish Rugby League consisted of five clubs, although one did not have any fixtures with the other competitors! Redruth became champions following their win at Camborne, in what was, the final league match of the season.

 Match abandoned when Redruth left the field.

1895–96

County Championship
The County Championship was reorganised with the fifteen teams divided into three groups. The first-placed teams of the South-eastern and South-western Divisions met in a play-off match, with the winners playing the first-placed team of the Northern Division in the final. Yorkshire won the competition for the seventh time defeating Surrey in the final. This was the third system of the County Championship.

Cornwall lost all three matches, and since their first match in 1892 have lost all eleven matches.

Cornish Rugby League
Throughout the season The Cornishman published a league table of the first two matches between six clubs. Only Penzance and Camborne completed all their fixtures and Truro only played five matches. Penzance was in first place and Redruth in second place.

At the end of the season a second table was published, of matches between the top four clubs with Redruth in first place and Penzance in second place. 'Impartial' the rugby reporter declared Redruth ″may fairly again claim the honour of being champions″.

1896–97

Cornwall Rugby Championship

1897–98

Cornish Rugby Championship

Notes

Junior League

Notes

1898–99

Cornish Rugby Championship

Note

Junior League

Notes

References

Bibliography

External links

   The Cornwall Rugby Football Union (The CRFU)
   Cornish Rugby Websites

19th century in Cornwall
 
Cornwall
Cornwall-related lists